Aleksandr Konstantinovich Petrov (also Alexander or Alexandre) (born 17 July 1957 in Prechistoye, Yaroslavl Oblast) is a Russian animator and animation director.

Biography
Petrov was born in the village of Prechistoye (Yaroslavl Oblast) and lives in Yaroslavl. He studied art at VGIK (state institute of cinema and TV) and was a disciple of Yuriy Norshteyn at Moscow's Advanced School for Screenwriters and Directors.

After making his first films in Russia he moved to Canada where he adapted the novel The Old Man and the Sea, resulting in a 20-minute animated short — the first large-format animated film ever made. Technically impressive, the film is made entirely in pastel oil paintings on glass, a technique mastered by only a handful of animators in the world. By using his fingertips instead of a paintbrush on different glass sheets positioned on multiple levels, each covered with slow-drying oil paints, he was able to add depth to his paintings. After photographing each frame painted on the glass sheets, which was four times larger than the usual A4-sized canvas, he had to slightly modify the painting for the next frame and so on. It took him over two years—from March 1997 through April 1999—to paint each of the 29,000+ frames. For the shooting of the frames a special adapted motion-control camera system was built, probably the most precise computerized animation stand ever made. On this an IMAX camera was mounted, and a video-assist camera was then attached to the IMAX camera. The film was highly acclaimed, receiving the Academy Award for Animated Short Film and Grand Prix at the Annecy International Animated Film Festival.

After this, Aleksandr Petrov has maintained a close relationship with Pascal Blais Studio in Canada, which helped fund The Old Man and the Sea, where he works on commercials. He returned to Yaroslavl in Russia to work on his latest film, My Love, which was finished in spring 2006 after three years' work and had its premiere at the Hiroshima International Animation Festival on 27 August, where it won the Audience Prize and the Special International Jury Prize.  On 17 March 2007, My Love was theatrically released at the Cinema Angelika in Shibuya, (Japan) by Studio Ghibli, as the first release of the "Ghibli Museum Library" (theatrical and DVD releases of Western animated films in Japan).

In a 2009 interview, Petrov stated that he was jobless and using-up the last of his previously earned money. A 2010 article stated that Petrov wants to create an animated feature film with his technique, but cannot start because of lack of funds. Four years later he directed a three-minute animated sequence for the Sochi Paralympic Games called Firebird (Жар-птица). In an interview later that year, Petrov confirmed that if he can find the funding, he would like to work on a feature film in the future using his signature style, and stated that he is currently working on a film project but that it is progressing with great difficulty.

In July 2016 Petrov sat on the board of directors for the International Film Festival of Poetic Animation held in Pergola, Italy.

Artistic style
Petrov's style from the late 1980s onward can be characterized as a type of Romantic realism. People, animals and landscapes are painted and animated in a very realistic fashion, but there are many sections in his films where Petrov attempts to depict a character's inner thoughts and dreams.  In The Old Man and the Sea, for example, the fisherman dreams that he and the marlin are brothers swimming through the sea and the sky.  In My Love, the main character's illness is represented by showing him being buried beneath freshly fallen snow on a dark night.

Filmography

Director
 1988—Marathon, Марафон (Marafon) (directed and animated with Mikhail Tumelya)
 1989—The Cow, Корова (Korova) (after Andrey Platonov)
 1992—The Dream of a Ridiculous Man, Сон смешного человека (Son smeshnovo cheloveka) (after Fyodor Dostoevsky)
 1997—Mermaid, Русалка (Rusalka) (after Alexander Pushkin)
 1999—The Old Man and the Sea (after Ernest Hemingway)
 2003—Participated in Winter Days, 冬の日 (Fuyu no hi)
 2006—My Love, Моя любовь (Moya lyubov) (after Ivan Shmelev)
 2014—Firebird, <small>Жар-птица' (Zhar-ptitsa)</small>

Art director
 1984—By a Wave of the Wand, По щучьему велению (Po shchuchyemu veleniyu) (directed by Valeriy Fomin, cutout animation)
 1985—Tale of a Small Fry, Сказочка про козявочку (Skazochka pro kozyavochku) (directed by Vladimir Petkevich, paint-on-glass)
 1986—Welcome, Добро пожаловать (Dobro pozhalovat) (directed by Alexei Karayev, paint-on-glass)
 1989—The Guardian, Хранитель (Khranitel) (directed by Vladimir Petkevich, ?)

Awards

1988—Ottawa International Animation Festival: Welcome, "Grand Prix"
1990—Berlin International Film Festival: The Cow, "Honorable Mention" in the category "Best Short Film"
1990—Academy Award for Best Animated Short Film: The Cow (nominated)
1990—Ottawa International Animation Festival: The Cow, "OIAF Award for Best First Film"
1992—Bombay International Documentary, Short and Animation Film Festival: The Cow, "Golden Conch for Best Animation Film"
1992—Ottawa International Animation Festival: The Dream of a Ridiculous Man, "Audience Award" and "OIAF Award for Best Production Between 10 and 30 Minutes in Length"
1993—Cracow Film Festival: The Dream of a Ridiculous Man, "Special Mention for the depiction of a crucial subject in the form of animation"
1997—Cinanima: The Mermaid, "Grand Prize"
1997—International Leipzig Festival for Documentary and Animated Film: The Mermaid, "Honorable Mention" in the category "Animated Films and Videos"
1997—2nd Open Russian Festival of Animated Film: The Mermaid, "Best Animator of a Drawn Film", "3rd Place Rating by Audience Vote"
1998—Academy Award for Best Animated Short Film: The Mermaid (nominated)
1998—Ottawa International Animation Festival: The Mermaid, "Craft Prize" in the category "Best Story"
1998—Zagreb World Festival of Animated Films: The Mermaid, "Grand Prize"
1999—Academy Award for Best Animated Short Film: The Old Man and the Sea2006—11th Hiroshima International Animation Festival: My Love, "Audience Prize" and "Special International Jury Prize"
2006—International Leipzig Festival for Documentary and Animated Film: My Love, "FIPRESCI Prize for Best Animation"
2006—Animation Show of Shows; My Love2007—12th Open Russian Festival of Animated Film: My Love, "Grand Prix", "Best Direction" and "Best Visuals"
2007—XVII International "Message to Man" Film Festival: My Love, "Grand Prix"
2007—Academy Award for Best Animated Short Film: My Love (nominated)

Bibliography
 Olivier Cotte (2007) Secrets of Oscar-Winning Animation: Behind the Scenes of 13 Classic Short Animations. (The Old Man and the Sea'') Focal Press.

References

External links
 
 Pascal Blais Studio - here you can see clips of Petrov's films (enter the English site, then click on "directors")
 Aleksandr Petrov at animator.ru
 English interview with AWN
 Trailer for the upcoming Ghibli DVD release of "My Love"
 FIPRESCI review of "My Love"
 Interview about his latest film (17 August 2006) 
 Fragment from Aleksandr Petrov's My Love with Esperanto subtitles

1957 births
Living people
People from Pervomaysky District, Yaroslavl Oblast
Soviet animation directors
Soviet film directors
Russian animators
Russian animated film directors
20th-century Russian painters
Russian male painters
21st-century Russian painters
High Courses for Scriptwriters and Film Directors alumni
Gerasimov Institute of Cinematography alumni
Soviet animators
Directors of Best Animated Short Academy Award winners
20th-century Russian male artists
21st-century Russian male artists